Fort New Salem is a frontier settlement of nineteenth century log structures located in Salem, Harrison County, West Virginia, United States, adjacent to Salem International University. Salem was originally settled in 1792 by a group of Seventh Day Baptist families from Shrewsbury, NJ. English, Welsh, Scotch-Irish and German farm culture shaped the traditions that dominated the region until the development of energy and mineral resources brought a wave of immigration into the area. Fort New Salem is a living history outdoor museum interpreting the history, crafts and lifestyles of the area. Historically, among the numerous seasonal activities held at the fort is "The Spirit of Christmas in the Mountains". This nationally recognized event is a joyous celebration of the traditional folk-ways found in observance of Christmas in West Virginia. Work on this village of over 18 relocated log structures began in 1971. The Fort opened to the public in 1974, as a part of Salem College (now known as Salem International University). The site is approximately eight acres, now owned by the Fort New Salem Foundation, Inc.

External links

References

New Salem
Open-air museums in West Virginia
Buildings and structures in Harrison County, West Virginia
Museums in Harrison County, West Virginia
Pre-statehood history of West Virginia